Gədik (also, Gedik and Gyadik) is a former village in the Quba Rayon of Azerbaijan. The village formed part of the municipality of Gədikqışlaq.

References

External links

Populated places in Quba District (Azerbaijan)